Freddy Qvick (6 November 1940 – 26 June 2021) was a Belgian football coach and player.

Career 
Qvick spent most of his career with AS Oostende. He made his debut in the 1956–57 season and played there until 1970. Qvick relegated with the club in 1958 to the Belgian Third Division. Three years later he became champion with KAA Gent in Third division A. In 1969, the club became champion in the Belgian Second Division, after which he joined the club in First division in the 1969–70 season. 

Later, he became a coach at KSC Menen, VG Oostende, AS Oostende, SK Roeselare and KAA Gent.

In 1974 he founded the Bal-Bal-school to teach children to play football without them already playing in a team. Qvick worked also as a teacher physician and a sports teacher.

Death 
Qvick died in June 2021 at the age of 80.

References 

1940 births
2021 deaths
Sportspeople from Ostend
Association football forwards
K.A.A. Gent managers
Belgian footballers
A.S.V. Oostende K.M. players
Belgian football managers